EORC may refer to:
Earth Observation Research Center
Engineer Officers' Reserve Corps, sometimes written as E.O.R.C.
Entoto Observatory and Space Science Research Center